Shabab Rafah Sports Club or simply Shabab Rafah is a Palestinian professional football club from the city of Rafah that plays in the Gaza Strip League, co-existing top flight competition with the West Bank Premier League.

History
The club was founded in 1953 under the name of Al-Shoaba Club. In 1960, it changed the name to Al-Oruba Club. In 1962, the Egyptian administration in the Gaza Strip founded a Youth Care Foundation and sponsored the club who changed the name to Nadi Markaz Reayat Al-Shabab (Youth Care Center Club).

After the Six-Day War of 1967, the club's activities stopped until 1973, the year when some of the loyal club members worked for the reconstruction and the revival of the club under the new name of the Shabab Rafah Sports Club and it formed the first administrative body headed by Ali Mehdi.

Achievements
Gaza Strip League
 Winners (2): 2008–09, 2013–14

 Palestine Cup
 Winners (1): 2016–17

Gaza Strip Cup
 Winners (4): 2002–03, 2005–06, 2012, 2016–17

Gaza Strip Super Cup
 Winners (4): 2013, 2014, 2017, 2018

References

External links
Team profile - Soccerway.com

Football clubs in the State of Palestine
Establishments in All-Palestine (Gaza)
1953 establishments in Asia